LCDR Ewa Zofia Miszewska, née Runge (1917–1972) - an officer of Polish Navy during world war II, she has organized and commanded Women's Naval Auxiliary Service (WNAS).

Ewa Miszewska became superintendent of WNAS after its separating in 1943 from Women's Auxiliary Service. She was trained at British officers course in Mill Hill and at Royal Naval College, Greenwich. After the end of the war she was promoted to junior inspector (Lieutenant Commander) and discharged in 1946, when all Polish Armed Forces in the West with women's auxiliary services within the Polish Resettlement Corps were disbanded. She emigrated to Argentina and lived in Mendoza, where she was known as Capitana Polaca.

1917 births
1972 deaths
Polish emigrants to Argentina
Polish female military personnel
Polish Navy officers